Richard Sher (July 18, 1948 – February 9, 2015) was the creator, executive producer, and host of the panel show Says You!.

Sher graduated from Dickinson College in Carlisle, Pennsylvania and worked as an optician. He then got a master's degree in communications from Boston University. He worked as a producer on Boston TV shows Chronicle and Evening Magazine prior to creating Says You!

Notes

1948 births
2015 deaths
American radio personalities
American radio producers
Boston University College of Communication alumni
Dickinson College alumni
American opticians
People from Easton, Pennsylvania